The 2002 Espirito Santo Trophy took place 16–19 October at Saujana Golf and Country Club, on its Palm Course and Bunga Raya Course, in Kuala Lumpur, Malaysia.

It was the 20th women's golf World Amateur Team Championship for the Espirito Santo Trophy.

The tournament was a 72-hole stroke play team event. There were 39 team entries, each with two or three players.

Each team played two rounds at the Palm Course and two rounds at the Bunga Raya Course in different orders, but the 21 leading teams played the fourth round at the Palm Course. The best two scores for each round counted towards the team total.

The Australia team won the Trophy for their second title, their first since 1978. Silver medalist team Thailand had the same total score as Australia, but Australia was declared the winner, since their third player, Vicky Uwland, had a lower score than Thailand's third player, Titiya Plucksataporn, in the final round, 78 against 81. Team Spain took the bronze on third place one stroke back. Defending champion France finished tied 15th.

The individual title went to Aree Song Wongluekiet, Thailand, whose score of 4-under-par, 288, was one stroke ahead of Tania Elóseguie, Spain, and Lindsey Wright, Australia.

Teams 
39 teams entered the event and completed the competition. Each team had three players, except the teams from Bolivia, Greece and Russia which had only two players. One player representing Croatia withdraw from the fourth round and one player representing Iran withdraw from the third and fourth round.

Results 

*Australia was awarded the tiebreak, since their third player, Vicky Uwland, had a lower score than Thailand's third player, Titiya Plucksataporn, in the final round, 78 against 81.Sources:

Individual leaders 
There was no official recognition for the lowest individual scores.

References

External links
Record Book on International Golf Federation website

Espirito Santo Trophy
Golf tournaments in Malaysia
Espirito Santo Trophy
Espirito Santo Trophy
Espirito Santo Trophy